Edward Bertrand Davis (February 10, 1933 – May 24, 2010) was a United States district judge of the United States District Court for the Southern District of Florida.

Education and career

Born in West Palm Beach, Florida, Davis served in the United States Army from 1953 to 1955. He received a Juris Doctor from the Fredric G. Levin College of Law at the University of Florida in 1960 and a Master of Laws from New York University School of Law in 1961. He was in private practice in Miami, Florida from 1961 until 1979.

Federal judicial service

Davis was nominated by President Jimmy Carter on August 10, 1979, to the United States District Court for the Southern District of Florida, to a new seat authorized by 92 Stat. 1629. He was confirmed by the United States Senate on October 4, 1979, and received his commission on October 5, 1979. He served as Chief Judge from 1997 to 2000. His service terminated on June 30, 2000, due to retirement.

Death

Davis died on May 24, 2010, in Miami.

References

Sources
 
 Judge Edward B. (Ned) Davis - Obituary

1933 births
2010 deaths
20th-century American judges
Judges of the United States District Court for the Southern District of Florida
United States district court judges appointed by Jimmy Carter
Fredric G. Levin College of Law alumni
New York University School of Law alumni